Crossotus arabicus is a species of beetle in the family Cerambycidae. It was described by Gahan in 1896.

References

arabicus
Beetles described in 1896